Downtown Memphis, Tennessee is the central business district of Memphis, Tennessee and is located along the Mississippi River between Interstate 40 to the north, Interstate 55 to the south and I-240 to the east, where it abuts Midtown Memphis.

It is home to the Memphis Redbirds, the AAA affiliate of the St. Louis Cardinals, and the Memphis Grizzlies NBA team.

History

Downtown is the oldest part of the city and includes the riverfront and the bluffs overlooking the Mississippi River. The founders of Memphis dedicated the riverfront to the public "now and forever" as long as the public use continued.  The land overlooking the riverfront was originally planned to become a "public promenade" to be called Mississippi Row. The upper riverfront became the site of the river landing where steamboats were loaded with cotton and other goods in the 19th and early 20th centuries. Between 1844 and 1886 the river landing was paved with limestone and granite cobblestones brought in from the upper Midwest.  This created what is today the largest intact Mississippi River landing still in existence, and is listed on the National Register of Historic Places. The explosion of the steamboat Sultana in 1865 near Memphis was one of the worst marine disasters in history.

There are several historic residences downtown, particularly in the Victorian Village neighborhood. Other historic homes include the Hunt-Phelan House (1830), the Magevney House (ca. 1835) and the Burkle Estate (1849).  The Burkle home and the Hunt Phelan House (533 Beale Street) were reputed to have been part of the underground railroad by which escaped slaves made their way to freedom prior to the Civil War.

Downtown Airport
In 1959, the Memphis Downtown Airport was opened on Mud Island, which at that time was called City Island. The one-runway airport could be reached by a pontoon-boat ferry and was used mostly by businessmen and shoppers. The Downtown Airport was closed in 1970. It was replaced in the 1990s by the new urbanist Harbor Town development.

Overview

Buildings

The Downtown Memphis skyline contains the tallest buildings in the city. The tallest building in Memphis, 100 North Main, is located at the heart of downtown along Main Street at Adams Ave and rises to 430 ft (131m). Some notable and/or historic downtown buildings are:

 100 North Main
 One Commerce Square
 Sterick Building
 Exchange Building, Memphis
 Morgan Keegan Tower
 First Tennessee Building
 Memphis Pyramid
 Peabody Hotel
 Madison Hotel
 Scimitar Building
 FedExForum
 Central Station
 201 Poplar

Downtown Memphis consists of 4.5 million square feet (418,000 square meters) of office space, around 1 million square feet (93,000 square meters) of retail space, 3,456 hotel rooms, and 13,400 housing units.

The administrative core of Memphis and Shelby County is also located in Downtown Memphis. These include the Memphis City Hall, and the Federal Building, located on North Main Street, in the Civic Center Plaza (corner of Main Street and Washington). Downtown Memphis also contains the Memphis branch of the Federal Reserve Bank of St. Louis.

Districts and neighborhoods

Downtown Core
Downtown Core is the heart of the central business district and includes the majority of office space, retail, entertainment and dining spaces. It is a popular regional destination for entertainment, dining, and tourism and includes attractions such as Beale Street, FedExForum, AutoZone Park, and the Peabody Hotel.

Districts & neighborhoods
 South Main Arts District
 Medical District
 Pinch District
 Peabody Place
 Beale Street
 South Forum (SoFo)
 Uptown
 Greenlaw
 Harbor Town
 The Edge
 Victorian Village
 South Bluffs
 Fort Pickering

Memphis Riverfront

Downtown Memphis is located on the banks of the  Mississippi River. The Memphis Riverfront stretches from the Meeman-Shelby Forest State Park in the north, to T. O. Fuller State Park in the south.

The River Walk is a park system along the Mississippi River that connects the Mississippi River Greenbelt Park in the north, to Tom Lee Park in the south.

Points of interest along the riverfront
 Chickasaw Bluff at Beale Street Landing
 Riverfront Trolley
 Mud Island
 Harbor Town
 Pinch District
 Steamboats
 Ashburn-Coppock Park
 President's Island

Economy
Companies headquartered in Downtown include:
 AutoZone
 First Horizon
 Southern Airways Express (One Commerce Square)
 ServiceMaster (Peabody Place)

Former headquarters:
 Pinnacle Airlines Corp. (One Commerce Square)

Schools
Downtown Memphis is zoned to the following Shelby County Schools (formerly Memphis City Schools) campuses:
 Downtown Elementary School
 Vance Middle School
 Booker T. Washington High School

Transportation
Downtown is served by major highways and interstates, public bus and trolley service by MATA, commercial bus service by Greyhound, and passenger train service by Amtrak.

Interstates I-40, I-55, I-69 and I-240 all run directly through downtown, providing direct access to the area from adjacent areas as well as the region as a whole. The new Interstate 22 is about 10 miles away from Downtown. Downtown also serves as the western termination point for U.S. Route 78 as well as U.S. Route 72, and is directly located along U.S. Route 51, U.S. Route 61, U.S. Route 64, U.S. Route 70, and U.S. Route 79.

MATA operates the North End Terminal, its primary hub for Memphis public bus service, at the corner of Main Street and A.W. Willis Avenue. The majority of fixed bus routes operates by MATA terminate at the North End Terminal, therefore bus accessibility in the area is very high.

The MATA Trolley is a heritage streetcar system that operates three lines in downtown along Main Street, Riverside Drive, and Madison Avenue. It consists of twenty four stations and, in 2021, had a daily ridership of approximately 650. Connections between MATA public bus and Main Street trolley line can be made at the North End Terminal.

Amtrak's City of New Orleans passenger train runs through Downtown Memphis three days a week, stopping at Central Station.

Gallery

Historic views

References

External links

 Center City Commission
 Memphis Downtowner Magazine

Neighborhoods in Memphis, Tennessee
Memphis
Yellow fever monuments and memorials